This is a list of notable television evangelists.  While a global list, most are from the United States.

Brazil

 Sônia Hernandes, Igreja Renascer em Cristo 
 Edir Macedo, Universal Church of the Kingdom of God 
 Silas Malafaia, Assemblies of God
 Valnice Milhomens, National Church of Lord Jesus Christ 
 Valdemiro Santiago, World Church of the Power of God
 Nivea Soares, Lagoinha Baptist Church
 R. R. Soares, International Church of God's Grace
 Ana Paula Valadão, Lagoinha Baptist Church and Before the Throne Church - by Lagoinha
 André Valadão, Lagoinha Baptist Church
 Márcio Valadão, Lagoinha Baptist Church
 Mariana Valadão, Lagoinha Baptist Church

United States

A
 A. A. Allen (1911–1970)
 Mother Angelica (1923–2016)
 Ernest Angley (1921–2021)
 John Ankerberg (born 1945)
 Garner Ted Armstrong (1930–2003)
 Herbert W. Armstrong (1892–1986)
 Kay Arthur (born 1933)

B
 Jim Bakker (born 1940)
 Tammy Faye Bakker (1942–2007)
 Doug Batchelor (born 1957)
 Todd Bentley (born 1976)
 George G. Bloomer (born 1963)
 Reinhard Bonnke (1940–2019)
 Juanita Bynum (born 1959)

C
 Christine Caine (born 1966)
 Harold Camping (1921–2013)
 Morris Cerullo (1931–2020)
 Twinkie Clark (born 1954)
 Bayless Conley (born 1955)
 Kenneth Copeland (born 1936)
 John Corapi (born 1947)
 Percy Crawford (1902–1960)
 Jan Crouch (1938–2016)
 Paul Crouch (1934–2013)

D
 Billy Joe Daugherty (1952–2009)
 Gregory Dickow (born 1964)
 Creflo Dollar (born 1962)
 Richard Dortch (1931–2011)
 Jesse Duplantis (born 1949)

E
 Frederick J. Eikerenkoetter II (1935–2009), better known as Reverend Ike

F
 Jerry Falwell Sr. (1933–2007)
 Mark Finley (born 1945)
 Jentezen Franklin (born 1962) 
 Robert J. Fox (1927–2009)
 Steven Furtick (born 1980)

G
 Anne Graham (born 1948) 
 Billy Graham (1918–2018)
 Franklin Graham (born 1952)
 Jack Graham (born 1950) 
 Robert Grant (born 1936) 
 W.V. Grant (born 1945)

H
 John Hagee (born 1940)
 Kenneth E. Hagin (1917–2003)
 Billy James Hargis (1925–2004)
 Jack Hayford (1934-2023)
 Kong Hee (born 1964)
 Dag Heward-Mills (born 1963)
 Marilyn Hickey (born 1931)
 Benny Hinn (born 1952)
 Bobbie Houston (born 1957)
 Brian Houston (born 1954)
 Rex Humbard (1919–2007)

J
 Orval Lee Jaggers (1916–2004) 
 T.D. Jakes (born 1957)
 T.B. Joshua (1963–2021)
 Leroy Jenkins (1934–2017) 
 Robert Jeffress (born 1955)
 David Jeremiah (born 1941)
 James F. Jones (1907–1971) 
 E. Bernard Jordan (born 1959)
 Noel Jones (born 1950)

K
 Bill Keller (born 1958)
 D. James Kennedy (1930–2007)
 Ben Kinchlow (1936–2019)
 Kathryn Kuhlman (1907–1976)

L
 Bob Larson (born 1944)
 Marcus Lamb (1957–2021)
 Greg Laurie (born 1952)
 Larry Lea (born 1951)
 Hal Lindsey (born 1929)
 Eddie L. Long (1953–2017)
 Max Lucado (born 1955)
 Gilbert Lumoindong (born 1966)

M
 James MacDonald (born 1960)
 Guillermo Maldonado (born 1965)
 Ray McCauley (born 1949)
 Clarence McClendon (born 1965)
 Joyce Meyer (born 1943)
 Beth Moore (born 1957)  
 Myles Munroe (1954–2014)
 Mike Murdock (born 1946)
 Arnold Murray (1929–2014)

N
 Zakir Naik (born 1965)

O
 Albert Odulele (born 1964)
 T.L. Osborn (1923–2013)
 Joel Osteen (born 1963)
 John Osteen (1921–1999)
 Paul Osteen (born 1955)  
 Chris Oyakhilome (born 1963)

P
 Luis Palau (1934–2021)
 Rod Parsley (born 1957)
 Earl Paulk (1927–2009)
 Carlton Pearson (born 1953)
 Michael Pitts (born 1964) 
 Peter Popoff (born 1946)
 Frederick K. C. Price (1932–2021) 
 Derek Prince (1915–2003)
 Joseph Prince (born 1963)

Q
 Apollo Quiboloy (born 1950)

R
 Daniel S. Razón (born 1967) 
 Oral Roberts (1918–2009)
 Richard Roberts (born 1948)
 Gordon P. Robertson (born 1958)
 Pat Robertson (born 1930) 
 James Robison (born 1943)
 Samuel Rodriguez (born 1969)
 Adrian Rogers (1931–2005)
 Richard Rossi (born 1963)

S
 Jerry Savelle (born 1946)
 R.W. Schambach (1926–2012)
 Bobby Schuller (born 1981) 
 Robert A. Schuller (born 1954)
 Robert H. Schuller (1926–2015)
 Gene Scott (1929–2005)
 Fulton Sheen (1895–1979)
 Kerry Shook (born 1962)
 Ralph Sockman (1889–1970)
 Eliseo Soriano (1947–2021) 
 Andy Stanley (born 1958)
 Charles Stanley (born 1932)
 Don Stewart (born 1939)
 Perry Stone (born 1959)
 Lester Sumrall (1913–1996)
 Jimmy Swaggart (born 1935)
 Charles Swindoll (born 1934)

T
 Robert Tilton (born 1946)
 Casey Treat (born 1955)

U
 Uebert Angel (born 1978)

V
 George Vandeman (1916–2000)
 Jack Van Impe (1931–2020)
 Eddie Villanueva (born 1946)

W
 Rick Warren (born 1954) 
 Paula White (born 1966)
 Jim Whittington (born 1941)
 Andrew Wommack (born 1949)
 Bill Winston (born 1943)
 Jack Wyrtzen (1913–1996)

Y
 Homer Edwin Young (born 1936)
 Ed Young (born 1961)
 Michael Youssef (born 1948)

Television evangelists
 
Evangelists